December 2015

See also

References

 12
December 2015 events in the United States